Pleurotomella goniocolpa is an extinct species of sea snail, a marine gastropod mollusk in the family Raphitomidae.

Description

Distribution
Fossils of this marine species were found in Eocene strata of Picardie, France.

References

 Cossmann (M.) & Pissarro (G.), 1913 Iconographie complète des coquilles fossiles de l'Éocène des environs de Paris, t. 2, p. pl. 46-65
 Cossmann (M.), 1913 Catalogue illustré des coquilles fossiles de l'Éocène des environs de Paris (5ème appendice). Annales de la Société royale Zoologique et Malacologique de Belgique, t. 49, p. 19-238
 Morellet (L.) & Morellet (J.), 1946 Faune des sables à Nummulites variolarius de Barisseuse, près Saint-Vast-lès-Mello (Oise), et remarques paléontologiques. Bulletin de la Société Géologique de France, t. 5, vol. 15, p. 337-356

goniocolpa
Gastropods described in 1889